Tyuler may refer to:
Aşağı Tüləkəran, Azerbaijan
Tülər, Azerbaijan